Gulch Island is an island lying northwest of Small Island in the Christiania Islands, in the Palmer Archipelago, Antarctica. The island is shown on an Argentine government chart of 1952. Gulch Island was so named by the UK Antarctic Place-Names Committee in 1960 because the island is deeply indented.

See also 
 List of Antarctic and sub-Antarctic islands

References

Islands of the Palmer Archipelago